Drugi brzeg is a 1962 Polish drama film directed by Zbigniew Kuźmiński.

Cast
 Józef Nowak
 Alicja Pawlicka
 Franciszek Pieczka
 Ludwik Pak
 Jerzy Bińczycki as Policeman
 Marian Jastrzębski
 Zdzisław Karczewski as Florian
 Halina Mikolajska as Woman with a Children
 Witold Pyrkosz as Gabrys
August Kowalski as Judge
Stanisław Ptak as Prisoner
Helena Chanecka as Parolowa

References

External links
 
Drugi brzeg on Filmweb (Polish)

1962 films
1962 drama films
Polish drama films
Polish black-and-white films
1960s Polish-language films